Of Wars in Osyrhia is the debut album by Fairyland, released on April 21, 2003 by N.T.S..

It is the last release of the band featuring the band's co-creator, bassist and songwriter, Willdric Lievin, before he came back in 2015, although he was a guest on the 2009 album "Score to a New Beginning".

Track listing
All tracks written by Philippe Giordana and Willdric Lievin.
 "And So Came the Storm"  – 1:25
 "Ride with the Sun"  – 4:54
 "Doryan the Enlightened"  – 5:44
 "The Storyteller"  – 3:47
 "Fight for Your King"  – 5:44
 "On the Path to Fury"  – 5:37
 "Rebirth"  – 4:30
 "The Fellowship"  – 6:24
 "A Dark Omen"  – 5:57
 "The Army of the White Mountains"  – 5:59
 "Of Wars in Osyrhia" – 10:51
 "Guardian Stones" (Japanese bonus track) - 4:13
 "The Fellowship (Remaster Demo Version)" (Korean bonus track) - 6:13

Credits
Elisa C. Martin - Vocals
Anthony Parker - Guitars
Willdric Lievin - Guitars, bass, drums
Philippe Giordana - Keyboards, backing vocals

References

Fairyland (band) albums
2003 albums

es:Anexo:Discografía de Fairyland#Of Wars in Osyrhia